Kuldeep Rawat (born 16 October 1984) is an Indian former cricketer. He played five first-class matches for Delhi between 2002 and 2011.

See also
 List of Delhi cricketers

References

External links
 

1984 births
Living people
Indian cricketers
Delhi cricketers
Cricketers from Uttarakhand